Miss Earth Venezuela 2007, or Sambil Model Venezuela 2007, was held on June 7, 2007, in Centro Sambil Caracas, Caracas, Venezuela. The winner was Silvana Santaella, and represented Venezuela in the Miss Earth 2007 beauty pageant, in the Philippines and won the Miss Earth - Water title, or Second runner up. She also won the special prizes Best in Long Gown and Best in Swimsuit.

Results
Sambil Model / Miss Earth Venezuela 2007: Silvana Santaella
Miss Continente Americano Venezuela 2007: Francis Lugo
1st Runner-up: Andreína Vilachá
2nd Runner-up: Anabel Montiel
3rd Runner-up: Karina Mendoza

Awards
Miss Internet: Marbelys García
Miss Press: Francis Lugo
Sambil Model Caracas: Silvana Santaella
Sambil Model Maracaibo: Elice Vizcaya
Sambil Model Margarita: Andreína Vilachá
Sambil Model Valencia: Patricia Madrigal
Sambil Model Barquisimeto: Anabel Montiel
Sambil Model San Cristóbal: Karina Mendoza

Contestants

 Amnery Meléndez (Maracaibo)
 Anabel Montiel (Barquisimeto)
 Andreína Gómez (Margarita)
 Andreína Padilla (San Cristóbal)
 Andreína Vilachá (Margarita)
 Aura Ansart (Valencia)
 Chiqui Montiel (San Cristóbal)
 Dahli Pabón (Margarita)
 Daniela Ruggiero (Caracas)
 Elice Vizcaya (Maracaibo)
 Francis Lugo (Caracas)

 Jade Pineda (Caracas)
 Karina Mendoza (San Cristóbal)
 Laksmi Rodríguez (Barquisimeto)
 Marbelys García (Valencia)
 Marisabel Pirela (Valencia)
 Nathalia Pineda (San Cristóbal)
 Nathaly Delgado (Caracas)
 Patricia Madrigal (Valencia)
 Silvana Santaella (Caracas)
 Stephania Grecco (Maracaibo)
 Vanessa Magnetti (Caracas)

References

External links
 Miss Earth / Sambil Model Venezuela Official Website
 Miss Earth Official Page

Miss Earth Venezuela
2007 beauty pageants
2007 in Venezuela